This is about the British actor. For others with this name, see Gerald James (disambiguation)

Gerald James (26 November 1917 – 10 June 2006) was a British actor best known for his character actor roles in British television productions such as The Sandbaggers, The Professionals, Secret Army, Sapphire & Steel, Hadleigh and The Pickwick Papers''.  He also appeared on stage with the Royal Shakespeare Company.

Filmography

External links
 

1917 births
2006 deaths
British male television actors